Eddie Jones (September 18, 1934 – July 6, 2019) was an American actor. He was known for playing Clark Kent's father Jonathan Kent in the ABC television series Lois & Clark: The New Adventures of Superman, and Charles Borden (a.k.a. The Official), head of The Agency, in the sci-fi television series The Invisible Man.

Personal life
Jones resided in Los Angeles, with his wife, director Anita Khanzadian-Jones, whom he married in 1991. He died on July 6, 2019, at Cedars-Sinai Medical Center.

Filmography

Film and television

Bloodbrothers (1978) .... Blackie
On the Yard (1978) .... Olson
The First Deadly Sin (1980) .... Officer Curdy
Prince of the City (1981) .... U.S. Marshal Ned Chippy
Q (1982) .... The Watchman
Trading Places (1983) .... Cop #3
Trick or Treat (1983) .... Victor Muldoon
C.H.U.D. (1984) .... Chief O'Brien
The New Kids (1985) .... Charlie
Year of the Dragon (1985) .... William McKenna
Invasion U.S.A. (1985) .... Cassidy
The Equalizer (1986-1989, TV Series) .... Lt. Brannigan / Mr. Winslow
The Believers (1987) .... Police Patient
Apprentice to Murder (1988) .... Tom Kelly
American Blue Note (1989) .... Sean Katz
Stanley & Iris (1990) .... Mr. Hagen
Cadillac Man (1990) .... Benny
The Grifters (1990) .... Mintz
The Young Riders (1990, TV Series) .... Benjamin Taylor
The Rocketeer (1991) .... Malcolm the Mechanic
A League of Their Own (1992) .... Dave Hooch
Sneakers (1992) .... Buddy Wallace
Cheers (1992) .... Dr. Kluger
The Positively True Adventures of the Alleged Texas Cheerleader-Murdering Mom (1993, TV Movie) .... C.D. Holloway
Lois & Clark: The New Adventures of Superman (1993–1997, TV Series) .... Jonathan Kent
Letter To My Killer (1995, TV Movie) .... Wilson Hartwick
True Friends (1998) ....  Father Reilly
Dancer, Texas Pop. 81 (1998) .... Earl
The Day Lincoln Was Shot (1998, TV Movie) .... Edwin M. Stanton
Stranger in My House (1999) .... Judge Prestwich
Return to Me (2000) .... Emmett McFadden
The Invisible Man (2000, TV Series) .... Charles Borden (The Official)
The Singing Detective (2003) .... Moonglow Bartender
The Big O (2003, TV Series) .... Sam
Seabiscuit (2003) .... Samuel Riddle
The Terminal (2004) .... Salchak
Fighting Tommy Riley (2005) .... Marty Goldberg
Castle (2009, TV Series) .... post office clerk
Disconnect (2010) .... Sheriff Bo Stevens
Act Your Age (2011) .... Harold
Mercy (2014) .... Pastor Gregory Luke 
Aghape .... Joe (2015) (Short film)
On the Road to Hollywood True Stories (2017) .... Himself 
Lost Dogs .... Pop (2018) (Short film)

Theatre
Off-Broadway

 Broadway

References

External links

Male actors from Pittsburgh
American male film actors
American male television actors
1934 births
2019 deaths
20th-century American male actors
Place of birth missing
Place of death missing